(born January 3, 1956) is a Japanese comedian and actor from Ichikawa, Chiba. He is attached to Asaikikaku.

Roles

Television programs

Television drama
Sērā Fukudōri (1986) (Tanaka-sensei)
Furuhata Ninzaburō (1994) (Shigeo Sakomizu)
Boku dake no Madonna (2003) (Shō Ichigaya)
Yae's Sakura (2013) (Iwakura Tomomi)

Variety shows
Lion no Gokigen'yoh  (1991 - 2016)

Animation
Demashita! Powerpuff Girls Z (xxxx) (Episode 41 Part A narrator)
Coji-Coji (xxxx) (Haukyū-kun)
The Powerpuff Girls (xxxx) (The Talking Dog, The Narrator)

Film
Godzilla vs. SpaceGodzilla (xxxx) (Sapporo Salary Man (section manager))
No Yōnamono (xxxx) (Kawashima)
Supermarket Woman (xxxx) (Head of Sales Promotion)

Dubbing roles

Live-action
Spy Kids series (Fegan Floop (Alan Cumming))

Animation
Cats Don't Dance (Danny)

Impression repertoire
Jōji Abe
Takejō Aki
Kinichi Hagimoto
Sei Hiraizumi (as Atsuo Itō from Good Luck!!)
Goro Ibuki
Ikko
Junji Inagawa
Mikijirō Hira
Gō Katō
Shintaro Katsu
Kinya Kitaōji
Masaomi Kondō
Yutaka Mizutani
Kaori Momoi
Kensaku Morita
Takenori Murano
Kenichi Nagira
Akira Nakao
Piiko (Katsuaki Sugiura)
Zomahoun Idossou Rufin
Masaaki Sakai
Hiroshi Sekiguchi
Sanma Akashiya
Muneo Suzuki
Masakazu Tamura (as Furuhata Ninzaburō)
Kunie Tanaka (as Gorō Kokuban from Kita no Kunikara)
Sakae Umezu
Atsushi Watanabe
Eikichi Yazawa
Hidetaka Yoshioka (as Jun Kokuban from Kita no Kunikara)

References

External links
Asaikikaku profile

1956 births
Japanese impressionists (entertainers)
Japanese radio personalities
Living people
People from Ichikawa, Chiba